Sphaerotholus is a genus of pachycephalosaurid dinosaur from the Upper Cretaceous of the western United States and Canada. To date, three species have been described: the type species, S. goodwini, from the Den-na-zin Member of the Kirtland Formation (Late Campanian) of San Juan County, New Mexico, USA; S. buchholtzae, from the Hell Creek Formation (Late Maastrichtian) of western Carter County, Montana, USA and the Frenchman Formation of Saskatchewan, Canada; and S. edmontonensis, from the Horseshoe Canyon Formation of Alberta, Canada.

History of discovery
 
The etymology of Sphaerotholus is a combination of the Greek sphaira, meaning "ball", and tholos, meaning "dome", and is a reference to the characteristically dome-shaped pachycephalosaurian skull. The survival of Sphaerotholus from the Campanian of New Mexico to the end of the Maastrichtian of Montana demonstrates that this taxon had both a relatively long duration (approximately 7-8 million years) and a widespread distribution. Williamson and Carr, who first described the genus in 2002, diagnose it as follows: "Differs from all other pachycephalosaurids where known in the possession of a parietosquamosal bar that decreases in depth laterally as seen in caudal view and is bordered by a single row of nodes and one lateroventral corner node." Sphaerotholus is considered a highly derived pachycephalosaur.

Species

Sphaerotholus goodwini

The holotype of the type species (NMMNH P-27403, New Mexico Museum of Natural History) consists of an incomplete skull lacking the facial and palatal elements. The species is diagnosed as follows: "Sphaerotholus which in caudal view possesses a parietosquamosal bar that reduces in depth laterally to a lesser extent than in S. buchholtzae and the parietal is reduced to a thin slip between the squamosals." The species name honors paleontologist Mark Goodwin for his work with pachycephalosaurian dinosaurs.

Sphaerotholus buchholtzae

The holotype of S. buchholtzae (TMP 87.113.3) consists of an incomplete skull. The species was diagnosed as having a parietal that is widely exposed  between the squamosals and wide enough to bear parietosquamosal nodes, a shallower caudal margin of the parietosquamosal shelf, the lateral corner node is reduced in size and located above the ventral margin of the parietosquamosal bar, and the nodes in the lateral margin of the parietosquamosal shelf reduced on the squamosal and coalescing into a ridge on the postorbital. The specific name honors Emily A. Buchholtz for her extensive work with pachycephalosaurians.

Sullivan (2003) considered S. buchholtzae a junior synonym of Prenocephale edmontonensis (or Sphaerotholus edmontonensis). However, Mallon et al. (2015), in their description of a new S. buchholtzae specimen from the Frenchman Formation of Saskatchewan, Canada, noted that S. edmontonensis was distinct from S. buchholtzae based on comparative morphology and morphometrics.

Sphaerotholus edmontonensis
A Troodon edmontonensis was described by Brown and Schlaikjer in 1943 on the basis of three domes from the Horseshoe Canyon Formation of Alberta. Williamson and Carr considered the species to be invalid, but in 2010 Nicholas Longrich et al. named a Sphaerotholus edmontonensis that could be distinguished from S. goodwini by the paired hornlets on the back of the dome, and from S. buchholtzae by the elongate parietals.

See also

 Timeline of pachycephalosaur research

References

Sources

External links
dinosaur.net.cn (includes photograph of the type skull of Sphaerotholus goodwini and a life restoration of same)

Late Cretaceous dinosaurs of North America
Hell Creek fauna
Fossil taxa described in 2002
Pachycephalosaurs
Horseshoe Canyon fauna
Kirtland fauna
Paleontology in New Mexico
Paleontology in Montana
Paleontology in Alberta
Campanian genus first appearances
Maastrichtian genus extinctions
Ornithischian genera